How to Be Shy is the debut studio album by Israeli indie rock artist Shy Nobleman, released on June 20, 2001.

Nobleman's backing band on the record is Israeli psychedelic rock band Rockfour. The album was produced by Shy Nobleman himself, and Rockfour singer Baruch Ben Yitzhak.

The album became successful in Israel and worldwide, becoming a Top 10 album in Israel and appearing on Rolling Stone magazine's Critics’ Top Albums of 2001 list. The album brings musical influences from various genres such as psychedelic rock, psychedelic pop, blues, folk and 60's pop.

Two singles were released from the album: "Lonely Boy" and "Sad Song Happy Song".

Track listing

Personnel
Shy Nobleman - lead vocals, rhythm guitar, piano, organ
Baruch Ben Yitzhak - lead guitar, bass, backing vocals
Marc Lazare - bass, backing vocals
Issar Tennenbaum - drums, percussion

Additional personnel
Rob Whitmore - bass
Roy Hadas - bass
Kfir Kaper - brass instruments
Tom Lewis - brass instruments
Barak Ravid - brass instruments
Uri Baum - brass instruments
The Kaleidoscope Quintet - strings
Eli Lulai - backing vocals
Nan Wisse - backing vocals
Asaf Talmudi - string arrangement
Eran Sahar - string arrangement

Production
Shy Nobleman - production
Baruch Ben Yitzhak - production
Ronan Tal - engineering
Liam Watson - engineering
Gadi Pugatsch - engineering
Oren Ben Simon - cover art
Hadar Kaplan - cover art

References

2001 debut albums
Neo-psychedelia albums
Shy Nobleman albums